Radhi Hassan Al-Radhi (born December 13, 1991) is a Saudi football player who plays a defender for Al-Sahel.

Career
On 27 July 2021, Al-Radhi joined Al-Qadsiah. On 8 July 2022, Al-Radhi joined Al-Sahel.

References

External links 
 

1991 births
Living people
Saudi Arabian footballers
Hajer FC players
Al-Adalah FC players
Al-Qadsiah FC players
Al-Sahel SC (Saudi Arabia) players
Saudi First Division League players
Saudi Professional League players
Association football defenders
Saudi Arabian Shia Muslims